was a Japanese all-female heavy metal band from Tokyo, formed in 2009 by four former members of Destrose. It consisted of vocalist Eye, drummer Mari, guitarist Saki and bassist Rio since 2012. After releasing three EPs as an independent band, they signed to Nippon Columbia for their first album, Countdown to Evolution (2014). Mary's Blood then switched to Victor Entertainment for the release of Bloody Palace (2015) and Fate (2016). They signed to Tokuma Japan Communications in 2018 and released three further studio albums, including their highest-charting, Confessions (2019). Mary's Blood began an indefinite hiatus on April 9, 2022.

History

2009–2017: Formation and major label debut
After the breakup of Destrose on New Year's Eve 2008, vocalist Eye, guitarist Eri, bassist Niboshi (formerly known as "Kayo"), and drummer Mari later regrouped and recruited guitarist Chiba to form Mary's Blood in December 2009. They are named after the "Bloody Mary" cocktail and its namesake, Queen Mary I of England. Although the band's name has always been written in English the same way, its members did not pronounce the "s" in Japanese until making their major label debut. They released their debut single "Save the Queen" on December 20. Their first EP, 0-Zero, was published on June 8, 2011. The single "Last Game" followed on November 28 and placed on Oricon's main chart despite being an independent band. In 2012, Chiba, Niboshi and Eri all left Mary's Blood in quick succession. Another Destrose alumni, Saki, was then recruited as guitarist, and the lineup of Eye, Mari, Saki and bassist Rio was finalized in September.

Mary's Blood performed their first international show in Houston, Texas at Anime Matsuri 2013. Their third EP, Azure, was released on July 10, 2013 and reached number 17 on the Oricon indies chart. The band signed with major record label Nippon Columbia and released their first album Countdown to Evolution on August 20, 2014. Its song "Marionette" was the ending theme of the TV Kanagawa show Mutoma. Readers of heavy metal magazine Burrn! voted Mary's Blood second place in its best newcomer category, "Marionette" seventh in the music category, and Countdown to Evolution 15th in the album category. The band also sold out their first solo tour, Tour Act 1: Countdown to Evolution. They were the opening act for Marty Friedman on September 25, 2014, and for Secret Sphere and Ego Fall on January 12, 2015. Mary's Blood performed at 2015's Naon no Yaon festival, a rock festival held by Show-Ya that features only female bands. They also opened for DragonForce in Hong Kong on August 30, 2015. The band switched labels to Victor Entertainment, released their second album Bloody Palace on October 7, and began the Invasion of Queen tour on October 17, 2015.

Mary's Blood hosted the Grand Cross Tour 2016, where they performed with a different act at each concert. On April 16 they played with thrash metal band Outrage, singer Nanase Aikawa joined them the following day, and Show-Ya frontwoman Keiko Terada performed with them on May 3. They released their third album Fate on October 26, 2016. It features collaborations with Seikima-II guitarist Luke Takamura, Show-Ya guitarist Miki "Sun-go" Igarashi, Kuroyume bassist Hitoki, and producer Yuyoyuppe. The band supported it with the Change the Fate tour that began on October 28, and ended on January 22, 2017 with Sun-go and Hitoki as guests. British record label JPU Records released Bloody Palace and Fate in Europe on August 18, 2017, while Fate (August 29, 2017) and Bloody Palace (October 17, 2017) were released in North America by Sliptrick Records.

2018–2022: Tokuma Japan and hiatus
After switching labels to Tokuma Japan Communications, Mary's Blood released their fourth album Revenant on April 18, 2018. Their next album Confessions was released in Japan on June 12, 2019, and became their highest-charting to date. It was released in Europe on October 4. That same day, Mary's Blood played their first show in Europe as the headliner of Metal Matsuri in London at the O2 Academy Islington. The band's Conceptual Tour was scheduled to take place in May 2020, but was postponed until August and September due to the COVID-19 pandemic in Japan. Re>Animator, a cover album of heavy metal versions of anime theme songs, was released on August 26, 2020. It features songs such as "Forever Love", "Magia", "Driver's High" and "Pegasus Fantasy". The last is sung as a duet with its original singer NoB, who has been Eye's vocal coach for the last 10 years.

In 2021, the band held the Kōtetsu Densetsu tour which featured special guests; Kentaro (ex-Gargoyle) on August 28, Masatoshi Ono on September 23, and Shingo☆ (Sex Machineguns) on October 23. Mary's Blood released their self-titled sixth studio album on September 29, 2021. Produced by Yorimasa Hisatake (producer of Galneryus), the band members described it as a return to their heavy metal origins. It was supported by the three-date Blow Up Our Fire Tour from November 13 to December 11.

On December 16, Mary's Blood announced that they would be going on indefinite hiatus in April 2022. The band apologized for the sudden announcement and explained that they decided to have a "recharging period" for the members to grow further and said that when they restart activities, they hope to deliver the music of Mary's Blood in a "more evolved form." Following two concerts titled The Final Day in Osaka on March 23 and Nagoya on March 24, the indefinite hiatus began after an April 9, 2022 concert at Tokyo's Toyosu Pit titled Mary's Blood The Final Day ~Countdown to Evolution~. The final concert was recorded and released on home video on July 30.

Following the hiatus, Saki continues to play in the band Nemophila (formed in 2019), while Mari has directed her focus to making drumming videos for her YouTube channel. Rio and Eye both began solo careers, the former under the name , with Mari following suit in 2023.

Musical style and songwriting
Saki described Mary's Blood as a straight heavy metal band, but because they have many different styles of songs, she feels free to make whatever sounds she wants with them. From the beginning of the group, Mari and Eye have consciously aimed to have vocal melodies that are catchy and easy for Japanese people to listen to. Saki stated that while their music is also consumed internationally, the band mainly thinks about Japanese listeners, and said it is hard to find a balance between the pop things and the heavy metal things as a member. The guitarist explained that Eye and Rio love visual kei music, which sometimes makes it difficult for her to find the tones to match the vocals in songs that they compose. Both Eye and Rio wanted to be in bands because of L'Arc~en~Ciel, Mari started playing music because of X Japan, and Saki was inspired to become a musician by Seikima-II.

Guitarist Eri was the main composer of songs in the initial lineup of Mary's Blood. Since joining in 2012, guitarist Saki has taken over this role. When writing for the band, she composes practically everything in the song, except for some drum fills that Mari comes up with. When vocalist Eye composes songs, she does so on piano because she can not play guitar. Rio has stated that the other members write the "so-called good songs," so the bassist believes she is responsible for bringing a different element via her own compositions. For example, "High 5" came from her love of punk rock, while "Hello" was inspired by "Dancing Queen". Eye is the main lyricist, and she writes them after receiving the melody from whoever wrote the song. The singer said that while there are times she would like to use English because it sounds cool, Japanese words have multiple meanings and sometimes conveying meaning is more important. Because she usually writes the lyrics, Eye also normally suggests the track order of albums based on their stories.

Mary's Blood's second and third EPs, Scarlet and Azure, had the themes "red" and "blue" respectively. Mari described their debut album Countdown to Evolution as emphasizing "heaviness and speed," while Saki said they intended it to be their "most intense and technical" record up to that point. Eye believes that the various guest musicians and arrangers on Fate provided a range of different sounds for the album. For example, Yuyoyuppe's composition "Angel's Ladder" marks the first time Saki and Rio had ever played a seven-string guitar and five-string bass respectively. Eye said the  recording environment for Revenant was totally different from those of their previous three albums, and explained its title was meant to mean the band was "reborn and starting over" while retaining their good qualities. Saki believes the album has a variety of different songs, explaining that for "World's End" she went with a typical modern metal sound and tone, but used an old school sound for "On the Rocks". Their next album, Confessions, is a concept album centered on the theme of "darkness." Because the band believes there are many different kinds of darkness, some songs sound cheerful on the surface, but their content is "quite depressing." After working with a belly dancer on their tour for Revenant, the Middle Eastern music that was used inspired "Laylah". Mary's Blood's sixth album is self-titled and has the concept of "heavy metal" with the intention of returning to their roots. Because of the theme, they asked Yorimasa Hisatake (known for his work with Galneryus and Animetal) to produce.

Yashiro supported Mary's Blood at live performances as second guitarist since 2014. Saki explained that continuously employing the same support guitarist is more efficient than using different ones as it cuts down on the need for rehearsals. She also said that Yashiro does not join as a full member due to her schedule with many different projects, while Yashiro herself stated she does not join in order to keep "the balance" between Mary's Blood's four members.

Members

Current members
 Eye – vocals (2009–2022)
 Mari – drums, bandleader (2009–2022)
 Saki – guitar, backing vocals (2012–2022)
 Rio – bass guitar, backing vocals (2012–2022)

Former members
 Chiba – guitar, backing vocals (2009–2012)
 Niboshi – bass, backing vocals (2009–2012)
 Eri – guitar, backing vocals (2009–2012)

Support member
 Yashiro – guitar, backing vocals (2014–2022)

Discography

Studio albums

EPs

Cover albums

Compilation albums

Singles

Video albums

References

External links
 

Japanese heavy metal musical groups
Japanese power metal musical groups
Musical groups from Tokyo
Musical groups established in 2009
2009 establishments in Japan
All-female bands
Musical quartets
Nippon Columbia artists
Victor Entertainment artists
Tokuma Japan Communications artists
Women in metal